The Battle of Brooklyn is the college sports rivalry between Long Island University and St. Francis College. The LIU Sharks and SFBK Terriers are both in the Northeast Conference and compete against each other in various sports. The Battle of Brooklyn is a fierce rivalry, which originated in men's basketball; while the two schools are rivals in all sports that both schools sponsor, the "Battle of Brooklyn" name is currently applied only to matchups in men's and women's basketball and men's soccer. The intensity of the rivalry is augmented by the proximity of the two universities, located less than a half-mile (about 500 m) apart in Downtown Brooklyn. The name of the rivalry is in reference to the first major battle of the American Revolutionary War, the Battle of Brooklyn.

Prior to 2019–20, the rivalry involved LIU's Brooklyn campus, branded athletically as "LIU" or "Long Island" through 2012–13 and "LIU Brooklyn" from 2013 forward. With the 2019 merger of the athletic programs of LIU's two main campuses (Brooklyn and Post), creating the current LIU Sharks, the Battle of Brooklyn continues to be a pure geographic rivalry in basketball. The men's soccer rivalry is no longer a geographic "Battle of Brooklyn" because the merged LIU program chose to house that sport at the Post campus in Nassau County, New York.

Men's basketball

The Battle of Brooklyn started as an annual basketball game played between the basketball programs of Long Island University (which then consisted only of today's LIU Brooklyn campus) and St. Francis College. The rivalry between the Terriers and the Sharks (previously known as the Blackbirds) dates back to the 1928 season, when they first played one another, but the tradition of an annual game between the two programs began in the 1975–76 season predating when both teams joined the Northeast Conference in the 1981. At the conclusion of each game an MVP is announced and the winning team receives the Lai-Lynch Trophy, which honors William Lai and Daniel Lynch, the former Athletic Directors of Long Island and St. Francis, respectively.

  
Both the St. Francis Brooklyn Terriers and the LIU Sharks compete in the Division I Northeast Conference. Although the two schools regularly play twice each regular season, only one of the games, usually the last, is officially designated as a Battle of Brooklyn game.  The host of the designated Battle of Brooklyn alternates annually and is held at campus sites. The Blackbirds host their games at the Steinberg Wellness Center. Through the 2021–22 season, the Terriers played home games at the Generoso Pope Athletic Complex. In 2022, SFC moved its campus from Remsen Street in Brooklyn Heights to Livingston Street in Downtown Brooklyn; with the new campus lacking a basketball venue, the Terriers will at least temporarily play home games at the Activity Resource Center (ARC) of Pratt Institute, located about 2 miles away in the Clinton Hill neighborhood. The 39th installment of the Battle of Brooklyn was held at the Barclays Center, the largest venue so far for the annual contest, with LIU Brooklyn as the hosts.  The Sharks lead the overall series 69–45 and the Battle of Brooklyn series 25–20.

Notable games

The first game of the Battle of Brooklyn rivalry was played on February 25, 1976 before 1,000 spectators at the "old Brooklyn Paramount theater." The game was decided in the final 40 seconds, when Tony Babin of St. Francis scored on a lay-up to give the Terriers a 3-point lead. 

In a testament to the rivalry's intensity, on January 4, 1994, the Terriers, suffering through the worst season in school history (eventually finishing at 1–26) stepped it up a notch and collected their only win of the season, beating LIU by 11 points, 78-67.
On February 22, 2003, the Terriers hosted the Blackbirds at The Pope and both teams set a NEC record for points in a game. The match-up went into double overtime and featured 282 points, with St. Francis winning, 142–140.
The Blackbirds' first game at the Steinberg Wellness Center was on January 26, 2006 against Sacred Heart. Yet the grand opening of the Steinberg Wellness Center was for the Long Island vs. St. Francis men's basketball game on February 27, 2006. The wait until the Battle of Brooklyn game for the grand opening of the Wellness Center is a testament to the rivalry's importance to both schools. The Blackbirds previously held their home games at the Schwartz Athletic Center.
 On February 6, 2010, the Blackbirds and Terriers went into triple overtime in the annual Battle of Brooklyn game. The Terriers were eventually able to beat the Blackbirds. After the game former LIU head coach Jim Ferry had this to say: "A 10-point lead in a Battle of Brooklyn game is never safe. I’ve been through this before, I think this is my third overtime game in this series..."

Men's game results
Long Island/LIU Brooklyn victories shaded black ██. Beginning with the 2019-20 season LIU victories are shaded gold ██.

St. Francis College victories are shaded blue ██.

Women's basketball

During the 1993–94 season the women's basketball programs of St. Francis College and Long Island University contested their first official Battle of Brooklyn. Since February 21, 1975 when the two teams first met, LIU leads the overall series 50–30. St. Francis leads the Battle of Brooklyn series 16–13.

Women's game results
Long Island/LIU Brooklyn victories shaded black ██. Beginning in the 2019-20 season LIU victories are shaded gold ██.

St. Francis victories are shaded blue ██.

Men's soccer

Starting in 2013, the men's soccer programs for LIU Brooklyn and St. Francis College formalized their rivalry by naming their annual match a Battle of Brooklyn and awarding a trophy. The trophy is called the Ramirez–Tramontozzi trophy and recognizes former men's soccer coaches Arnie Ramirez and Carlos Tramontozzi, from LIU (Brooklyn) and St. Francis respectively. Both coaches were lifelong friends and greatly influenced their respective programs. St. Francis Brooklyn captured the inaugural trophy on LIU's field on November 10, 2013, behind a 4–0 performance. Since the 1970 season, when the two programs first met, LIU leads the overall series 25–23–4.

Since the LIU athletic merger, the men's soccer rivalry is no longer a Battle of Brooklyn in geographic terms, as LIU moved its unified men's soccer program to the Post campus.

Men's game results
LIU Brooklyn victories (2013–2018) shaded black ██. LIU victories (2019–present) are shaded gold ██. St. Francis victories are shaded blue ██.''

Note that the 2013 men's soccer season, the first in which the "Battle of Brooklyn" name was applied to the rivalry, was also the first in which LIU's Brooklyn campus had officially adopted "LIU Brooklyn" as its athletic brand name.

See also
 College rivalry

References

External links
 St. Francis College Official Athletics site
 Long Island University Official Athletics site

College basketball rivalries in the United States
College soccer rivalries in the United States
St. Francis Brooklyn Terriers men's basketball
St. Francis Brooklyn Terriers women's basketball
St. Francis Brooklyn Terriers men's soccer
LIU Brooklyn Blackbirds men's basketball
LIU Sharks men's basketball
LIU Brooklyn Blackbirds women's basketball
LIU Sharks women's basketball
LIU Sharks men's soccer
Recurring sporting events established in 1975
Sports in Brooklyn